Myriotrema is a genus of lichen-forming fungi in the family Thelotremataceae.

Species
Myriotrema aggregans 
Myriotrema arimense 
Myriotrema barroense 
Myriotrema calvescens 
Myriotrema cinereoglaucescens 
Myriotrema clandestinoides 
Myriotrema clandestinum 
Myriotrema classicum 
Myriotrema columellatum 
Myriotrema compunctum 
Myriotrema concretum 
Myriotrema congestum 
Myriotrema deceptum 
Myriotrema decorticatum 
Myriotrema eminens 
Myriotrema endoflavescens 
Myriotrema exile 
Myriotrema fluorescens 
Myriotrema foliaceum 
Myriotrema foliicola 
Myriotrema fragile 
Myriotrema frondosolucens 
Myriotrema frondosum 
Myriotrema frustillatum 
Myriotrema glauculum 
Myriotrema grandisporum 
Myriotrema granulosum 
Myriotrema hartii 
Myriotrema hypoconsticticum 
Myriotrema immersum 
Myriotrema inspersum 
Myriotrema leucohymenium 
Myriotrema mammillare 
Myriotrema maroense 
Myriotrema microphthalmum 
Myriotrema microporum 
Myriotrema minutulum 
Myriotrema minutum 
Myriotrema multicavum 
Myriotrema muluense 
Myriotrema myrioporoides 
Myriotrema myrioporum 
Myriotrema myriotremoides 
Myriotrema neofrondosum 
Myriotrema neoterebrans 
Myriotrema norsticticum 
Myriotrema norstictideum 
Myriotrema olivaceum 
Myriotrema plurifarium 
Myriotrema porinaceum 
Myriotrema polytretum 
Myriotrema protocetraricum 
Myriotrema protofrustillatum 
Myriotrema pulverulentum 
Myriotrema reclusum 
Myriotrema rugiferum 
Myriotrema scabridum 
Myriotrema secernendum 
Myriotrema sembilanense 
Myriotrema sphinctrinellum 
Myriotrema squamiferum 
Myriotrema steyermarkii 
Myriotrema subanamaliense 
Myriotrema subclandestinum 
Myriotrema subconforme 
Myriotrema subcostaricense 
Myriotrema subviride 
Myriotrema temperatum 
Myriotrema terebratulum 
Myriotrema thailandicum 
Myriotrema thwaitesii 
Myriotrema uniseptatum 
Myriotrema urceolare 
Myriotrema viride 
Myriotrema viridialbum 
Myriotrema whalleyanum 
Myriotrema zollingeri

References

 
Lichen genera
Ostropales genera
Taxa named by Antoine Laurent Apollinaire Fée
Taxa described in 1825